"Girl You Know It's True" is a song by Maryland-based group Numarx, later made internationally famed by German dance-pop group Milli Vanilli.  Released as the lead single from MV's European debut album, All or Nothing (1988), and the duo's American debut album, Girl You Know It's True (1989), the song peaked at number one on the German Singles Chart, number two in the United States and number three in the United Kingdom, becoming one of Milli Vanilli's most successful singles.

Background
The song was written by Bill Pettaway Jr., Sean "DJ Spen" Spencer, Kevin Liles, Rodney "Kool Rod" Holloman (often misspelled "Hollaman" on single/album credits) and Ky Adeyemo, most of whom were members of the Baltimore, Maryland-based group Numarx, who first recorded the song.

Started by DJ Spen and featuring Kool Rod as the original MC, Numarx was a collective of local DJs who formed a "crew" in the early 1980s, originally consisting of four members. The group expanded to five in the mid-1980s with the addition of Liles as fellow MC. In 1987, having already released material during their early years, Numarx released the single "Rhymes So Def", which received national airplay at the time. The follow-up single to this minor hit was "Girl You Know It's True".

The idea for the song began when the group (Numarx) wrote a rap to a track composed by local musician/songwriter Bill Pettaway. Liles and Holloman wrote the words and Spencer made the beat. The song was recorded at Studio Records in Oxon Hill, Maryland - just outside of Washington, DC.  Bill Pettaway, an Annapolis resident was working as a gas station attendant at the time also wrote songs and played guitar on the side. Pettaway, along with Numarx members Spencer, Liles, and Holloman continued to craft the tune.  In addition, then-current Starpoint member Kayode "Ky" Adeyemo joined in, co-writing and co-producing the song with Pettaway. Adeyemo played keyboards and wrote the infectious “Ooh Ooh Ooh” hook for the song. Kevin Liles and Kool Rod are the lead vocalists rhyming on the record with Spencer providing some background vocals. However, the most prominent vocalist on the hook and backing vocals of the song is Charles "Ooh Oh Ooh" Christopher.  Charles was friends with Pettaway, Adeyemo, and Starpoint keyboardist George Phillips and became the voice that everyone was singing along with. Although the song did not match the success of "Rhymes So Def" in America, "Girl You Know It's True" did connect with audiences on the other side of the Atlantic, becoming a popular hit in the German clubs.  It was here that Milli Vanilli producer Frank Farian likely first heard the tune.

Meanwhile, the Numarx would later include their version of "Girl You Know It's True" on their lone album, Our Time Has Come, released in 1988. The group formed a small independent record label, the following year,  called Marx Brothers Records releasing several regional hits including “Do It Good”, which was later remixed by Basement Boys and became a dance music hit. The group disbanded in the early 90s. DJ Spen went on to become an on-air radio personality in Baltimore. He later joined the Baltimore-based powerhouse dance music production outfit Basement Boys that produced hit dance music numbers for Michael Jackson, Crystal Waters, Toni Braxton, and Ultra Nate’. He is now a world-renowned DJ that runs an independent dance music label and production company, Quantize Recordings. After working as a local music promoter on the east coast, Liles went on to work for Def Jam Recordings, where he eventually worked his way to the role of President. He is currently CEO of 300 Entertainment in New York, which produces and manages some of the biggest names in R&B and hip hop music. Pettaway was later credited with discovering multi-platinum-selling singer Toni Braxton and has gone on to prominence as a session guitarist for Timbaland and other artists.

Recording
The Milli Vanilli version of "Girl You Know It's True", recorded at Frank Farian's FAR studios in Rosbach, Germany in the spring of 1988, started with only a drum track and two female vocalists, Linda Rocco and Jodie Rocco, American twin sisters living in Germany and successful in the music industry. Farian asked the girls to listen to the Numarx version so they would know what to sing. The record was on a turntable in the studio and Farian played the vocal parts for the girls. There was only the drum track to follow, making the Rocco twins the first vocals on the track.

Chart performance
"Girl You Know It's True" was a big success in the United States, peaking at No. 2 on the Billboard Hot 100 for the week ending 1 April 1989. It became the first of five top 5 singles for Milli Vanilli and spent a total of 26 weeks on the chart.

Critical reception
American magazine Cash Box called the song "an average quasi-rap that goes nowhere."

Impact
South Korean singer  Seo Taiji cited that Milli Vanilli is one of his influences. The melody of Seo Taiji and Boys' 1992 signature hit, I Know is strikingly similar Seo briefly rapped Fab Morvan's part in the demo version of the song, the similarities between the two songs led to the accusation of alleged plagiarism.

Remixes
The New York City subway remix of the song features samples from several pop and R&B artists who were popular in the '80s. These include Flavor Flav's signature "Yeah, boyyy" phrase and a piece from Dennis Edwards' 1984 song "Don't Look Any Further".

Track listings
 12-inch maxi – Australia, New Zealand, UK
 "Girl You Know It's True" (NY Subway mix) – 8:07
 "Girl You Know It's True" (Balearic mix) – 6:24
 "Magic Touch" – 3:47

 12-inch maxi – Canada, U.S.
 "Girl You Know It's True" (Super Club mix) – 8:33
 "Girl You Know It's True" (G Spot remix beats) – 6:22
 "Girl You Know It's True" (single version) – 3:48
 "Girl You Know It's True" (NYC Subway mix) – 8:07
 "Magic Touch" — 3:47

 12-inch maxi – Germany, UK
 "Girl You Know It's True" (Super Club mix) – 8:49
 "Girl You Know It's True" (radio mix) – 4:14
 "Magic Touch" – 3:47

 7-inch single
 "Girl You Know It's True" – 4:14
 "Magic Touch" – 3:47

 7-inch single – UK 2nd issue, Sweden' "Girl You Know It's True" (NYC Subway Mix Edit/Summer '88 Mix) – 4:00
 "Magic Touch" – 3:47

Charts

Weekly charts

Year-end charts

Certifications

Other versions
The song was covered by Centory featuring Trey D. in 1996 which reached No. 50 on the official German singles chart, and remaining on the chart for 10 weeks.
A version was recorded by Keith Duffy and Shane Lynch (of Boyzone) as Keith 'N' Shane in 2000, with the rapped verses taking verbal shots at rival boybands Westlife and 5ive. It reached No. 36 on the UK Singles Chart.
In 2001, Oli P. and Jan van der Toorn recorded a cover with an additional German-language rap section performed by van der Toorn. The release charted at No. 17 on the official German singles chart staying for 10 weeks. It also charted on the Ö3 Austria Top 40 peaking at No. 40.
In 2007, a rap version was made by German R&B duo Lemon Ice made up of Gunther Göbbel (Geeno) and Jay Low. It reached No. 26 on the German singles chart.
Danish artist Burhan G had a hit with the Danish language single "Jeg vil ha' dig for mig selv" that largely samples "Girl You Know It's True". Taken from his self-titled album Burhan G, "Jeg vil ha' dig for mig selv" (translated as "I want you for myself") reached No. 8 on Tracklisten, the official Danish singles chart.

In popular culture
Milli Vanilli made a cameo appearance performing the song in an episode of NBC's Saturday-morning cartoon The Adventures of Super Mario Bros. 3'', based on the video game. The episode, entitled "Kootie Pie Rocks", aired on 27 October 1990. After the lip-synching scandal broke out the following month, the episode was edited to replace the Milli Vanilli songs featured in the episode ("Girl You Know It's True" and "Blame It on the Rain") with a generic pop instrumental, and specific references and jabs at these songs were removed. However, the group themselves are still mentioned by name.

In 2018, the song was featured in an advert for Fridge Raiders.

See also

 List of European number-one hits of 1988
 List of number-one hits of 1988 (Germany)

References

1987 songs
1988 debut singles
1996 singles
2000 singles
2007 singles
Milli Vanilli songs
Centory songs
Song recordings produced by Frank Farian
Cashbox number-one singles
Number-one singles in Austria
European Hot 100 Singles number-one singles
Number-one singles in Germany
Number-one singles in Greece
Number-one singles in Spain
Arista Records singles
Hansa Records singles
Pop-rap songs